The Volkswagen Routan is a seven-seat minivan and rebadged variant of the Chrysler RT platform, with revised styling, content features, and suspension tuning from the fifth-generation Dodge Grand Caravan and Chrysler Town & Country.

Manufactured alongside the Chrysler and Dodge minivans at Windsor Assembly and marketed in the United States, Canada, and Mexico, the Routan debuted at the 2008 Chicago Auto Show and went on sale in the United States in September 2008. The Routan's minivan variants include the Dodge Caravan, Ram C/V, Chrysler Town & Country, and Lancia Voyager (export)—that by 2009 have ranked as the 13th best-selling automotive nameplate worldwide, with over 12 million sold.

Production of the Routan was halted in 2012 due to high inventory levels, and Volkswagen announced the 2013 model year would be primarily reserved for rental car companies and other fleets, with limited availability to the public at dealer showrooms. This also held true for the 2014 model year Routan.

History
The Routan marked the start of Volkswagen's business strategy to offer additional vehicles specially developed for the U.S. market. The introduction of the 2009 model year minivan resulted from a partnership that began in 2005 between Volkswagen and DaimlerChrysler. Prior to the agreement, Volkswagen had no minivan model for the United States or Canadian markets. The Routan was sold only in North America (U.S., Canada, Mexico).

The automaker's intent with outsourcing production of the Routan to Chrysler was to avoid the significant expense of developing its own family-sized minivan. VW announced in an early 2008 projection that the company intended for the Routan and other models to help achieve significant expansion of U.S. sales. The Routan was Volkswagen's first van offered in North America since discontinuation of the Volkswagen Eurovan in 2003, and is not related to the European-market Volkswagen Touran.

In 2012, Volkswagen halted production of the Routan at Chrysler's Windsor, Ontario, plant, despite having a production contract that ran through 2014. In January 2013, Volkswagen announced there would be no 2013 retail model, but held open the possibility that development may resume with a potential 2014 model. The 2013 Routan was reserved for fleet purchasers, and 2,500 were produced by Chrysler during the calendar year.

Automotive industry analysts were not surprised by VW's decision to drop the Routan because buyers had no reason for selecting the Routan over the similar Dodge Grand Caravan or the Chrysler Town & Country, and the Routan's base price of nearly $28,000 was far more than the basic $21,000 Grand Caravan, while the Routan's list of equipment was less than included on the upscale Town & Country.

Features

Interior
The Routan features a rebranded version of Chrysler's hard-drive-based audio and navigation system—marketed by Chrysler as the MyGig system and by Volkswagen as the Joybox, but has neither Chrysler's Stow'n Go nor Swivel'n Go seating systems.  Instead, the second-row seats in the Routan feature the Easy Out Roller Seat system, but can be modified using Chrysler or Dodge parts to have Stow'n Go or have Swivel'n Go seats installed. Routans for 2010 offered optional Wi-Fi access, which was also offered in Dodge and Chrysler versions as UConnect Web.

Engine

For 2011, the Routan is available with a new engine from Chrysler, the 3.6 L V6 producing  and  mated to a six-speed automatic from Chrysler.

Markets

United States
Volkswagen Group of America had projected for the Routan to gain at least five percent of the U.S. minivan market, or 45,000 units of the 700,000 minivans sold currently. In January 2009, VW of America asked Chrysler Canada to stop production of the Routan for the month of February after 29,000 Routans had been shipped to US dealerships. By July 2009, 11,677 units had been sold.

Trims

Sales

Mexico
Volkswagen de México markets the Routan alongside the Transporter (formerly marketed locally as the Eurovan), replacing the European-built Volkswagen Sharan minivan in the autumn of 2008.

Trims

Canada
Volkswagen Canada began selling the Routan during the autumn of 2008. Like its United States counterpart, VW Canada had not featured a minivan in its vehicle lineup since the discontinuation of the Eurovan. For the four months that the Routan minivan was on sale in Canada in 2008 (September through December), the company sold 335 units. The only engine available was the 4.0 L. The 3.8 L was not available in Canada. An evaluation of 2011 Canadian-market models described the Dodge-based minivan as "one of the best on the road and the VW version is a real bargain compared to buying a well-optioned Chrysler version" and that includes a nicer interior as well as sportier suspension and steering.

Trims

Replacement
At the 2013 North American International Auto Show, Volkswagen revealed the Volkswagen CrossBlue Concept SUV. The automaker is considering a seven-passenger SUV based on the show car as a replacement for the Routan. The production SUV, called Atlas, was launched in 2017 as a 2018 model.

Recalls

Ignition Switch
"Volkswagen recalled 20,676 examples of the 2009–2010 Routan minivan to replace their key fobs and ignition switches." "In these vehicles, it's possible that if the switch is jarred, the key can be jostled out of the Run position. If this happens, then the engine shuts off, and the airbags, power steering, and power brakes are all deactivated, which is a safety problem."

References

External links

Volkswagen of America Routan Website
Volkswagen Mexico Routan Website
Volkswagen Canada Routan Website

Cars introduced in 2009
Front-wheel-drive vehicles
Minivans
Routan
2010s cars